Jones C. Beene Jr. (November 26, 1882 – May 6, 1968) was a college football player and coach.

University of Tennessee
Beene was a prominent end for the Tennessee Volunteers of the University of Tennessee.

1902
His blocking and tackling received praise in the Vanderbilt game of 1902.

1904
Beene was selected All-Southern in 1904.

Coaching career

Chattanooga
He coached the Chattanooga Mocs.

Tennessee Wesleyan
He was also the first coach of the Tennessee Wesleyan Bulldogs.

Head coaching record

References

External links
 

1882 births
1968 deaths
American football ends
Chattanooga Mocs football coaches
Tennessee Volunteers football players
Tennessee Wesleyan Bulldogs football coaches
All-Southern college football players
Players of American football from Tennessee